Francisco Franco (1892–1975) was a Spanish Head of State and Prime Minister.

Francisco Franco may also refer to:

 Francisco Franco National Foundation, Spanish foundation and propaganda hub 
 Equestrian statue of Francisco Franco, bronze statue in Madrid, Spain
 Statue of Francisco Franco, Melilla, statue in Melilla, Spain
 Generalissimo Francisco Franco is still dead, catchphrase from NBC's Saturday Night
 Francisco Franco del Amo (1960–2021), Spanish academic and author
 Francisco Franco (footballer) (born 1987), Mexican footballer

See also
 Francis Franco (born 1954), Spanish aristocrat, businessman and poacher and grandson of the former head of state
 Francisco Di Franco (born 1995), Argentine footballer